The 2019 USA Cross Country Championships was the 129th edition of the USA Cross Country Championships. The USA Cross Country Championships took place in Tallahassee, Florida, on 2 February 2019 and served as the US Trials for 43rd edition of IAAF World Cross Country Championship (6 member teams). The men's race was won by Shadrack Kipchirchir in 28:52.5. The women's race was won by Shelby Houlihan in a time of 32:46.8.

Results 
Race results

Men

Women

References

External links
USA Cross Country
2019 USA Cross Country results

2019
USA Cross Country Championships
USA Cross Country Championships
USA Cross Country Championships
USA Cross Country Championships
Sports in Tallahassee, Florida
Sports competitions in Florida